Daron Louis Rahlves (born June 12, 1973) is a former American World Cup alpine ski racer and freestyle skier.

Biography

Born in Walnut Creek, California, and raised in Northern California, Rahlves attended the Green Mountain Valley School in Vermont and currently resides in Truckee, California. He retired from racing at the end of the 2006 season with twelve World Cup victories and a world championship.

Rahlves earned three World Championships medals, a gold in 2001 in the Super-G and a silver and bronze (downhill and giant slalom) in 2005.  His best year in the overall World Cup standings was 2006, when he finished fourth.  Rahlves' best years in the downhill standings were 2003 and 2004, when he placed second. He was also the runner-up in the Super G standings in 2004.

Rahlves was named to the U.S. Olympic team as a freestyle skier for the 2010 Winter Olympics in Vancouver. He competed in the ski cross event at Cypress Mountain and placed 24th.

Personal life
Daron is married to Michelle  and has twins: son Dreyson and daughter Miley (born in July 2007).

Movies
Rahlves has been featured in several movies as his racing career matured and after retirement. 2005 brought Rahlves' first appearance in Warren Miller's "Impact". In 2007, Rahlves was featured in Rage Films' movie "Enjoy" as well as Jalbert Productions' "The Thin Line: Examination of the Downhill" and in 2008 has segments in Warren Miller's "Children of Winter" and again in Rage Film's movie "Down Days". He has also been in Warren Miller's Dynasty and Matchstick Productions' "In Deep in 2009. In 2010 Rahlves starred in Teton Gravity Research's "Light The Wick" and in 2011 Warren Miller's "Like There's No Tomorrow". Rahlves was a featured in Teton Gravity Research's "The Dream Factory". Most recently, Rahlves rode a night scene in Alyeska in which the snow was backlit with array of projected LED colors for Sweetgrass Productions "Afterglow" in 2014.

Awards and titles
 2001 World Championships in St. Anton, Austria: Gold Medal in Super-G.
 2003 Hahnenkamm in Kitzbühel, Austria: 1st place in Downhill, the first American champion on the prestigious Streif course in 44 years (Buddy Werner in 1959).
 2004 Hahnenkamm in Kitzbühel, Austria: 1st place in Super G, becoming the first American champion ever in that race.
 2005 World Championships in Bormio, Italy: Silver Medal in Downhill behind Bode Miller, completing the first 1-2 finish for American men ever at the Worlds.
 Bronze Medal in Giant slalom.
 2006 Lauberhorn in Wengen, Switzerland: 1st place in Downhill (third American to win)
 12 World Cup victories.
 7 U.S. National Championships titles

World Cup results

Season standings

Race victories
 12 wins – (9 DH, 3 SG)
 28 podiums – (20 DH, 7 SG, 1 GS)

World Championship results

Olympic results

References

External links
 
 
 

1973 births
Alpine skiers at the 1998 Winter Olympics
Alpine skiers at the 2002 Winter Olympics
Alpine skiers at the 2006 Winter Olympics
American male alpine skiers
American male freestyle skiers
Freestyle skiers at the 2010 Winter Olympics
Living people
Olympic alpine skiers of the United States
Olympic freestyle skiers of the United States
Sportspeople from Walnut Creek, California
X Games athletes
People from California
People from Olympic Valley, California